Governor Bourchier may refer to:

Charles Bourchier (governor) (died 1810), Governor of Madras from 1767 to 1770
Richard Bourchier, Governor of Bombay from 1750 to 1760